Kurier Poranny (Polish for Morning Courier) can refer to one of the following Polish newspapers:
Kurier Poranny (1877-1939)
Kurier Poranny (modern)